Chaitannya Choudhry is an Indian television actor known for playing Harsh in Aahat or Kanha Chatterjee in Uttaran and Shardul Sinha in Star Plus's Yeh Hai Mohabbatein.

Television

References

External links

21st-century Indian male actors
Indian male television actors
Living people
Year of birth missing (living people)
Actors from Mumbai